William M. Chase, N. A. is a 1902 painting by John Singer Sargent. It is part of the collection of the Metropolitan Museum of Art in New York.

The subject of the portrait, William Merritt Chase, was an American painter, known as an exponent of Impressionism and as a leading New York art teacher. The postnomial N. A. indicates his election to New York's National Academy of Design. The painting was commissioned by a group of his pupils, who subsequently raised the money to pay Sargent by exhibiting the work.

The work is now on view in The Metropolitan Museum's Gallery 774.

See also
 1902 in art

References

1902 paintings
20th-century portraits
Paintings by John Singer Sargent
Paintings in the collection of the Metropolitan Museum of Art
Portraits of men